Aganya may refer to:
Aganya, a diminutive of the Russian first name Agafon
Aganya, a diminutive of the Russian first name Agap